The 1986 Australian Individual Speedway Championship was held at the Pioneer Park Speedway in Ayr, Queensland on 11 January. Eighteen-year-old Brisbane based rider Troy Butler surprised by winning his first (and only) Australian Championship and in doing so becoming the youngest winner in the history of the Australian Championship since it was first run in 1926. The top four placed riders were all from Queensland with he first non-Queenslander being fifth placed South Australian Steve Baker who lost a runoff for fourth place to Steve Regeling. Baker and Regeling were the only riders to defeat Butler on the day.

In the absence of six time and reigning champion Billy Sanders who had died in England in April 1985, Victoria's three time national champion Phil Crump was the favourite to take out his fourth title. However, after winning his first race, Crump suffered engine failure in his next two rides to put him well out of contention. He won his fourth ride but again suffered engine drama in his last race to eventually finish 12th with just 6 points.

1986 Australian Solo Championship
 Australian Championship
 11 January 1986
  Ayr, Queensland - Pioneer Park Speedway
 Referee: 
 Qualification: The top four riders go through to the Commonwealth Final in Manchester, England.

Classification

References

See also
 Australia national speedway team
 Sport in Australia
 Motorcycle Speedway

Speedway in Australia
Australia
Individual Speedway Championship